The Union of Royalists was a coalition of far-right Greek political parties for the elections of 1935.

Its main leader was Ioannis Metaxas. Members to the coalition were:
 Freethinkers' Party
 Ioannis Rallis
 Georgios Stratos
 several independent royalists and former members of the People's Party

1930s in Greece
Defunct political party alliances in Greece
Monarchist parties in Greece